Halichaetonotus is a genus of gastrotrichs belonging to the family Chaetonotidae.

The species of this genus are found in Europe and Central America.

Species

Species:

Halichaetonotus aculifer 
Halichaetonotus arenarius 
Halichaetonotus atlanticus

References

Gastrotricha